Kaki may refer to:

People
 Abubaker Kaki (born 1989), a Sudanese middle-distance runner
 Kaki King (born 1979), a musician

Places

Iran
 Kaki, Hormozgan, a village in Hormozgan Province
 Kaki, Iran, a city in Bushehr Province
 Kaki District, a district in Bushehr Province
 Kaki Rural District, a rural district in Bushehr Province

Other places
 Kaki, French Polynesia, a village in northern Hao, in French Polynesia's Tuamotu Archipelago
 KaKi, or Kaltenkirchen, a town in Schleswig-Holstein, Germany

Other
 KAKI (FM), a radio station (88.1 FM) licensed to serve Juneau, Alaska, United States
 KBZU, a radio station (106.7 FM) licensed to serve Benton, Arkansas, United States, which held the call sign KAKI until 1992

 Kaki Klon Suphap, a traditional Thai folk tale, and the main character, Lady Kaki
 Ka Kee, a 1980 Thai fantasy film based on the story

 Kaki, or Kaki fruit Diospyros kaki, a fruit better known as Japanese persimmon or Asian persimmon
 Kakī, the Maori name of the black stilt, a critically endangered wading bird of New Zealand.

See also

 
 Kakki (disambiguation)
 Khaki (disambiguation)
 Qakh (city)